Eric Gerard Coleman  (born December 27, 1966 in Denver, Colorado) is a former defensive back in the National Football League for the New England Patriots. Coleman attended University of Wyoming.

References

External links
NFL.com player page

1966 births
Living people
Players of American football from Denver
American football cornerbacks
Wyoming Cowboys football players
New England Patriots players